Preston Tower is a ruined L-plan keep in the ancient Scottish village of Prestonpans. It is situated within a few metres of two other historic houses,  Hamilton House and Northfield House.

History

The original structure, some of which may date from the 14th century, has four storeys. A further two storeys were added above the parapet in 1626, with Renaissance windows bearing the initials SIDKH (Sir John and Dame Katherine Hamilton).

The entrance to the Tower had a lean-to hoarding from which items could be dropped, for instance boulders, hot sand, or boiling oil.

Preston passed by marriage to the "haughty Hamiltons" (also known as "Hameldone") at the close of the 14th century. David Hamilton of Preston went France with James V in 1536. Preston Tower was burnt by the Earl of Hertford on 16 May 1544 following the burning of Edinburgh during the war known as the Rough Wooing. David Hamilton was a Master Usher for Regent Arran, and fought for Mary, Queen of Scots at the battle of Langside. 

His widow, Jonet Bailie, died in 1592. Her will mentions cattle and hogs on the farm, and an iron chain and winch with buckets for draining a mine. Their son George married Barbara Cockburn (died November 1610), a daughter of John Cockburn of Ormiston. His grandson John married Katherine Howison (died 1629) as his second wife, and their initials were carved on Preston Tower. They employed a stone mason, William Pedden, who also worked at Winton Castle, and a glazier, James Wauche. A family pew in the church also featured their carved initials and painted heraldry. In 1617 John Hamilton and the Earl of Lothian held a trial for John Hunter, the blacksmith in Prestonpans. Over several years he had stolen iron plough shares and fittings from farms in the neighbouring villages for scrap metal.

The tower was burnt again in 1650 Oliver Cromwell with the loss of the family records. After being restored it burnt again, accidentally, in 1663 and was abandoned for the nearby Preston House, East Lothian. One of the Hamilton family was the noted covenanter Robert Hamilton, a commander in the battles of Drumclog and Bothwell Brig. After this, the family were forfeited in 1684, but recovered the property in the 19th century.

Preston Tower was purchased by the National Trust for Scotland in 1969. It is currently under the guardianship of East Lothian Council.

The site also has a laburnum arch, and a herb garden, and a lectern-style doocot which dates from the mid-17th century, after Cromwell had sacked the Tower. Preston Tower has a pit-prison but the Preston Merkat Cross was eventually used as the local prison instead.

Photo gallery

See also
List of places in East Lothian

References

Further reading

External links
 Video about Preston Tower's history
 A Structural History of Preston Tower
 Drawing of Preston Tower, 1834, Joseph Turner, Tate

Castles in East Lothian
Scheduled Ancient Monuments in East Lothian
Tower houses in Scotland
Prestonpans